This is a list of fortresses in China built by the Goguryeo kingdom, which was originally based in modern Liaoning and Jilin provinces in Northeast China.

See also
Korean fortress

References

 
Buildings and structures in Manchuria
Forts in China
Korea-related lists
Lists of buildings and structures in China